Sean Francis Cox (born September 24, 1957) is an American lawyer and judge serving as the Chief United States district judge of the United States District Court for the Eastern District of Michigan.

Education and career

Cox was born in Detroit, Michigan. He received a Bachelor of General Studies degree from the University of Michigan in 1979 and his Juris Doctor from the Detroit College of Law (now the Michigan State University College of Law) in 1983. Prior to joining the federal bench, Cox was a trial judge in Michigan for the Third Judicial Circuit Court in Wayne County, Michigan. He was appointed by Governor John Engler in 1996. Before that, Cox was in private practice in Michigan from 1983 to 1996.

Federal judicial service

President George W. Bush nominated Cox to the United States District Court for the Eastern District of Michigan on September 10, 2004, and renominated him on February 4, 2005, to fill a vacancy left by Judge Lawrence Paul Zatkoff. Due to the opposition of Michigan Senators Carl Levin and Debbie Stabenow, Cox's nomination was not voted on until June 8, 2006, when he was confirmed by voice vote. He received his commission on June 12, 2006. He became Chief Judge on February 21, 2022.

References

External links

Thomas, Ken, "Senate confirms Ludington, Cox to federal bench," Associated Press, June 8, 2006.
Biography at the United States District Court for the Eastern District of Michigan

1957 births
Living people
21st-century American judges
Detroit College of Law alumni
Judges of the United States District Court for the Eastern District of Michigan
Michigan state court judges
Lawyers from Detroit
United States district court judges appointed by George W. Bush
University of Michigan alumni